Larry Fort, Jr. (born January 3, 1990) is an American football linebacker who is a free agent. He played college football at Northern Iowa and was signed by the Cleveland Browns as an undrafted free agent in 2012.

Fort has been a member of the Denver Broncos, Seattle Seahawks, Cincinnati Bengals, New England Patriots, Pittsburgh Steelers, Philadelphia Eagles, and Baltimore Ravens.

College career
Fort was a three-year starter at Northern Iowa as an outside linebacker. He was a second-team Missouri Valley Football Conference selection in 2010. The following season, Fort was named the Missouri Valley Football Conference's Defensive Player of the Year and was named a finalist for the NCAA FCS National Defensive Player of the Year Award.

Professional career

Cleveland Browns
Fort signed with the Cleveland Browns as an undrafted free agent and made the 53-man roster for the 2012 regular season opener.

Fort started for the Browns in Week 1 due to injuries to Chris Gocong, James-Michael Johnson, and Emmanuel Acho. He had his first career interception against the Philadelphia Eagles in that game, picking off Eagles' quarterback Michael Vick.

Fort played in all 16 regular season games for the Browns, finishing his rookie season with 20 tackles, 1 sack, and 1 interception.

Denver Broncos
Fort signed a future reserve contract with the Denver Broncos on December 31, 2013. He was released by the Broncos on August 29, 2014.

Seattle Seahawks
On October 22, 2014, Fort was signed to the Seattle Seahawks practice squad. Fort signed with the team as a fullback. He was activated for one regular season game in 2014.

Cincinnati Bengals
On November 26, 2014, Fort was signed to the Bengals' practice squad. He was released on April 29, 2015.

New England Patriots
On August 4, 2015, Fort signed with the New England Patriots. Fort was released on August 18, 2015.

Pittsburgh Steelers
On August 19, 2015, Fort signed with the Pittsburgh Steelers. Fort was released on September 5 and was re-signed to the practice squad the following day. He was promoted to the active roster on December 28 to replace injured fullback Roosevelt Nix for the team’s final game.

Fort was released by the Steelers on November 12, 2016 but was re-signed three days later.

On September 12, 2017, Fort was waived by the Steelers and was re-signed to the practice squad the next day. He was promoted to the active roster on September 23, 2017.

Philadelphia Eagles
On March 14, 2019, Fort signed a three-year $5.5 million contract with the Philadelphia Eagles. He was released on September 27, 2019 after four games.

Baltimore Ravens
On September 30, 2019, Fort was signed by the Baltimore Ravens. On October 13, against the Cincinnati Bengals, Fort made his first start as a Raven, registering 2 tackles and a pass defense.  During the Ravens 30-16 win over the Seattle Seahawks, Fort registered six tackles, including two for loss, a quarterback hit and his first quarterback sack as a Raven.  On November 8, 2019, he signed a two-year, $5.5 million contract extension with the Ravens after becoming the starter due to injury. On December 8, 2019, Fort sacked Buffalo Bills quarterback Josh Allen on a crucial third down late in the fourth quarter.

In Week 1 of the 2020 season against the Cleveland Browns, Fort forced a fumble on punter Jamie Gillan and later recovered a fumble lost by running back Nick Chubb during the 38–6 win. In Week 2, against the Houston Texans, he had a 22-yard fumble return for a touchdown in the 33–16 victory. He was placed on the reserve/COVID-19 list by the team on November 3, 2020, and activated four days later.

At the start of the 2021 new league year, Baltimore chose not to pick up Fort's option for 2021, allowing him to become a free agent. He re-signed with the team on a one-year contract on April 2, 2021. In 2021, Fort changed his jersey number from #58 to #3 following the relaxation of the NFL's jersey number rules.

In the second quarter of the Week 2 preseason game against the Carolina Panthers, Fort tore his ACL, prematurely ending his season. He was placed on injured reserve on August 23, 2021.

NFL career statistics

References

External links
Baltimore Ravens bio
Northern Iowa Panthers bio

1990 births
Living people
American football linebackers
Baltimore Ravens players
Cincinnati Bengals players
Cleveland Browns players
Denver Broncos players
New England Patriots players
Northern Iowa Panthers football players
People from Waynesville, Missouri
Philadelphia Eagles players
Pittsburgh Steelers players
Players of American football from Missouri
Seattle Seahawks players